Julio Sumiu is a 2014 Brazilian comedy film directed by Roberto Berliner based on the novel of the same name by Beto Silva.

Cast
 Lília Cabral as Edna
 Carolina Dieckmann as Madá
 Fiuk as Silvio
 Augusto Madeira as J. Rui
 Stepan Nercessian as Delegado Barriga
 Leandro Firmino as Tião Demônio
 Pedro Nercessian as Julio
 Hugo Grativol as Zeca
 Dudu Sandroni as Eustáquio
 Babu Santana as Caolha

References

External links
 

Brazilian comedy films
Films based on Brazilian novels
Films shot in Rio de Janeiro (city)
Films set in Rio de Janeiro (city)
2014 comedy films
2014 films